Elaphriella meridiana is a species of sea snail, a marine gastropod mollusk in the family Solariellidae.

Description
The size of the shell varies between 5 mm and 6.5 mm.

Distribution
This marine species is endemic to New Zealand at occurs off Chatham Rise at a depth of 360 m.

References

 Dell R.K. (1953), A Molluscan Fauna from the Chatham Rise, New Zealand; Records of the Dominion Museum v. 2 p. 37-50
 Powell, A.W.B. 1979: New Zealand Mollusca: Marine, Land and Freshwater Shells. Collins, Auckland 500p 
 Marshall, B.A. 1999: A revision of the Recent Solariellinae (Gastropoda: Trochoidea) of the New Zealand region. The Nautilus 113: 4-42
  Spencer, H.G.; Marshall, B.A.; Maxwell, P.A.; Grant-Mackie, J.A.; Stilwell, J.D.; Willan, R.C.; Campbell, H.J.; Crampton, J.S.; Henderson, R.A.; Bradshaw, M.A.; Waterhouse, J.B.; Pojeta, J. Jr (2009). Phylum Mollusca: chitons, clams, tusk shells, snails, squids, and kin, in: Gordon, D.P. (Ed.) (2009). New Zealand inventory of biodiversity: 1. Kingdom Animalia: Radiata, Lophotrochozoa, Deuterostomia. pp. 161–254

External links
 To Biodiversity Heritage Library (1 publication)
 To World Register of Marine Species
 
 Williams S.T., Kano Y., Warén A. & Herbert D.G. (2020). Marrying molecules and morphology: first steps towards a reevaluation of solariellid genera (Gastropoda: Trochoidea) in the light of molecular phylogenetic studies. Journal of Molluscan Studies. 86(1): 1–26

meridiana
Gastropods described in 1953